David Mathew may refer to:

 Sir David Mathew (1400–1484), Welsh knight and English Standard Bearer
 David Mathew (bishop) (1902–1975), English bishop and historian
 David Mathew (Big Brother), joint winner of Big Brother Australia 2005

See also
 David Matthews (disambiguation)